DCPS may refer to:

Dahlem Centre of Plant Sciences, a research focus area of Freie Universität Berlin, Germany
DCPS (gene), a human gene that encodes the scavenger mRNA-decapping enzyme DcpS 
DCPS (TV channel), a public-access television station based in Duval County, Florida
Distributed cyber-physical system, a cyber-physical system which involves extensive distributed computation
District of Columbia Public Schools, which operates the public schools in Washington, DC
Dominican Convent Primary School, Bulawayo, an independent school in Bulawayo, Zimbabwe
Dulwich College Preparatory School, a private school in the United Kingdom
Duval County Public Schools, which operates public schools in Jacksonville, Florida
M7GpppX diphosphatase, an enzyme

It might also be used for
Miami-Dade County Public Schools